Binduri is one of the constituencies represented in the Parliament of Ghana. It elects one Member of Parliament (MP) by the first past the post system of election. Binduri was part of in the Bawku Municipal district  of the Upper East Region of Ghana but has since June 2012 become a full district.

Boundaries
Binduri shares boundaries with Garu Tempane District to the east and south, Bawku Municipality to the north and Bawku West District to the west in the Upper East Region of Ghana.

Members of Parliament

Elections

See also
List of Ghana Parliament constituencies

References 

Parliamentary constituencies in the Upper East Region